Roby Alberto Norales Núñez (born 25 January 1991), is a Honduran footballer who plays for Honduran club Mukura Victory Sports F.C. as a forward.

Club career
Roby made his National League debut for F.C. Motagua on 28 August 2011 under head coach Ramón Maradiaga against Platense F.C.
His first goal came against C.D. Victoriaon 13 November the same year, where he went on to score 2 goals at the Estadio Nacional.

Bengaluru
On 7 January 2017, Norales signed for Indian I-League champions, Bengaluru FC. However, after 4 games, he was loaned out to I-League 2nd division team Ozone FC. He scored only 1 goal with the club in the league.

Platense
After unsuccessful stint in India, Norales rejoined Platense in 2017–18 season.

Mukura Victory
After a failed spell at Kosovo with KF Liria, Norales joined Mukura Victory in Rwanda for the 2020 season.

International career
He was summoned for the first time to the Honduras national team in August 2012 for matches against Cuba in 2014 World Cup Qualifiers.

On 3 November 2016 he made his international debut in a friendly against Belize, coming on as a substitute in the 46th minute of the match.

On 4 November 2016 he received a call by Jorge Luis Pinto for games against Panama and Trinidad and Tobago for the 2018 World Cup Qualifiers.

Personal life
Born in Rio Esteban, a village 20 km from Balfate he came to San Pedro Sula in 2009 to play football and joined the youth team of F.C. Motagua. Honduras national team striker Romell Quioto is his cousin.

References

External links
 

1991 births
Living people
Honduran footballers
Honduran expatriate footballers
Association football forwards
Liga Nacional de Fútbol Profesional de Honduras players
Indian Super League players
F.C. Motagua players
C.D. Real Sociedad players
Platense F.C. players
Bengaluru FC players
Ozone FC players
Juventud de Las Piedras players
KF Liria players
Honduras international footballers
Honduran expatriate sportspeople in Guatemala
Honduran expatriate sportspeople in Uruguay
Expatriate footballers in Guatemala
Expatriate footballers in India
Expatriate footballers in Uruguay
Expatriate footballers in Kosovo
Expatriate footballers in Rwanda